JORX-DTV, branded as  is the flagship station of the Japan News Network (JNN), owned-and-operated by , a subsidiary of JNN's owner, TBS Holdings. It operates in the Kantō region and broadcasts its content nationally through TBS-JNN Network, or Japan News Network.

TBS produced the Takeshi's Castle game show, which is dubbed and rebroadcast internationally.  The channel was also home to Ultraman and the Ultra Series franchise from 1966 – itself a spinoff to Ultra Q, co-produced and broadcast in the same year – and its spinoffs, most if not all made by Tsuburaya Productions for the network; in the 2010s, Ultra Series moved to TV Tokyo. Since the 1990s it is home to  Sasuke (Ninja Warrior),  whose format would inspire similar programs outside Japan, by itself a spinoff to the legendary TBS game show Kinniku Banzuke that lasted for 7 seasons.

On May 24, 2017, TBS and five other major media firms (TV Tokyo, Nikkei, Inc., WOWOW, Dentsu and Hakuhodo DY Media Partners) officially announced that they would jointly establish a new company in July to offer paid online video services. TBS Holdings would become the largest shareholder of the new company, Premium Platform Japan, with a 31.5% stake. An official from TBS Holdings, named Yasuhiro Takatsuna, became the new company's president.

History

Early history 
Matsutarō Shōriki, the former owner of Yomiuri Shimbun, brought forward the original idea of private broadcasting in Japan in 1951.In June of the following year, NHK, Yomiuri Shimbun, and Radio Tokyo (the first private radio broadcaster), became the first few applicants to apply for a TV broadcast license.

Broadcasting

Analog
JORX-TV (former callsign: JOKR-TV) - TBS Television ( TBS Terebijōn TBSテレビジョン (former Japanese name: 東京放送 Tōkyō Hōsō))
Tokyo Tower - Channel 6
Islands in Tokyo
Niijima - Channel 56
Ibaraki Prefecture
Mito - Channel 40
Tochigi Prefecture
Utsunomiya - Channel 55
Gunma Prefecture
Maebashi - Channel 56
Kiryu - Channel 55
Saitama Prefecture
Chichibu - Channel 18
Chiba Prefecture
Chiba City - Channel 55
Urayasu - Channel 56
Kanagawa Prefecture
Yokohama-minato - Channel 56
Yokosuka-Kurihama - Channel 39
Hiratsuka - Channel 37
Odawara - Channel 56

Digital
JORX-DTV - TBS Digital Television (TBS Dejitaru Terebijōn TBSデジタルテレビジョン)
Remote Controller ID 6
Tokyo Skytree - Channel 22
Mito - Channel 15
Utsunomiya - Channel 15
Maebashi - Channel 36
Hiratsuka - Channel 22

Networks
TBS programming is also broadcast across JNN-affiliate stations nationwide, which include the following:
Headquartered in Osaka, broadcast in the Kansai area: MBS, Analog: Channel 4, Digital: Channel 16 (Osaka, ID: 4)
Headquartered in Nagoya, broadcast in the Chukyo area: CBC, Analog: Channel 5, Digital: Channel 18 (Nagoya, ID: 5)
Headquartered in Sapporo, broadcast in Hokkaidō: HBC, Analog: Channel 1, Digital: Channel 19 (Sapporo, ID: 1)
Headquartered in Aomori, broadcast in Aomori Prefecture: ATV, Analog: Channel 38, Digital: Channel 30 (Aomori, ID: 6)
Headquartered in Morioka, broadcast in Iwate Prefecture: IBC, Analog: Channel 6, Digital: Channel 16 (Morioka, ID: 6)
Headquartered in Sendai, broadcast in Miyagi Prefecture: TBC, Analog: Channel 1, Digital: Channel 19 (Sendai, ID: 1)
Headquartered in Nagano, broadcast in Nagano Prefecture: SBC, Analog: Channel 11, Digital: Channel 16 (Nagano, ID: 6)
Headquartered in Takaoka, broadcast in Toyama Prefecture: TUT, Analog: Channel 32, Digital: Channel 22 (Takaoka, ID: 6)
*Headquartered in Fukuoka, broadcast in Fukuoka Prefecture: RKB, Analog: Channel 4, Digital: Channel 30 (Fukuoka, ID: 4)

Headquartered in Naha, broadcast in Okinawa Prefecture: RBC, Analog: Channel 10, Digital: Channel 14 (Naha, ID: 3)

Programs
Below is a selection of the many programs that the network has broadcast.
Kinniku Banzuke (筋肉番付, Unbeatable Banzuke in America) a former obstacle based game show that inspired Sasuke 
Sasuke (Ninja Warrior in the United States) an obstacle course based game show that was originally part of Kinniku Banzuke
Another World (もう一つの世界)
Days of Our Lives (私たちの生活の日々)
Passions (情熱)
Music Television
Santa Barbara (サンタバーバラ)
Sunset Beach (サンセットビーチ)
Mino Monta no Asa Zuba! (みのもんたの朝ズバッ!!)
Sanma's Super Karakuri-TV (さんまのスーパーからくりTV)
Tokyo Friend Park II (関口宏の東京フレンドパークII)
Count Down TV
The World Heritage (THE世界遺産)
Dragon Zakura (ドラゴン桜)
Princess Resurrection
Japan Cable Award (発表!日本有線大賞)
Japan Record Award (輝く!日本レコード大賞)
Tokyo Music Festival (東京音楽祭)
Food Battle Club
Takeshi's Castle (風雲!たけし城)
Evening 5 (イブニング・ファイブ) → THE NEWS (総力報道! THE NEWS) → N Studio (Nスタ)
Karei-naru Ichizoku''' (華麗なる一族) - TBS 55th anniversary drama starring Takuya Kimura (SMAP)Lincoln (リンカーン)Utaban (うたばん) → The Music Hour (ザ・ミュージックアワー)BANG BANG BASEBALL - baseball gamesWheel of FortuneMasters TournamentToray Pan Pacific OpenFIVB Volleyball Men's World Championship, FIVB Volleyball Women's World Championship, FIVB Volleyball World LeagueIAAF World Championships in Athletics (IAAF Official Broadcaster with Eurovision)Happy family plan (しあわせ家族計画)Survivor (サバイバー)Ah, You're really Gone Now. This TV film  was selected at the 49ème Festival de télévision de Monte-Carlo in Monte-Carlo in June 2009. It obtained the special commendation of the SIGNIS Jury.Hiroshima Showa 20 nen 8 Gatsu Muika (2005)Japanese Americans'' (2010)

Anime programming

See also
 Hobankyo – organization based in Japan that enforces TBS copyright issues.
 TBS video controversy – alleged cause of the Sakamoto family murder incident

References

External links
 
 

Tokyo Broadcasting System
Japan News Network
Television stations in Japan
Television in Tokyo
Japanese-language television stations
Television channels and stations established in 1955
1955 establishments in Japan
Mass media companies based in Tokyo
Anime companies
Akasaka, Tokyo